The 32nd Oregon Legislative Assembly was the biannual session of the bicameral state legislature held in the state of Oregon in 1923.

House members 

Speaker of the House: K.K. Kubli (R–18 Portland).

Senate members 

Senate President: Jay H. Upton (R–17 Prineville)

See also 

 Government of Oregon

References 

1923 in Oregon
1924 in Oregon
32
1923 U.S. legislative sessions
1924 U.S. legislative sessions